Flaherty may refer to:

Places
Flaherty, Kentucky, an unincorporated community in Meade County
Flaherty Island, in Qikiqtaaluk Region, Nunavut, Canada

People
Ó Flaithbheartaigh, an Irish surname (includes a list of all notable persons with the surname Flaherty)

Other
USS Flaherty (DE-135), an Edsall-class destroyer escort